Stephen Thomas Wright (born July 17, 1942) is a former American football offensive tackle in the National Football League (NFL) for five different teams.  He also played for the Chicago Fire of the WFL in 1974.  He played college football at the University of Alabama.  He never started a game for Alabama, but was drafted in the fifth round of the 1964 draft, by the Green Bay Packers along with the New York Jets in the eighth round; although New York offered a blank check, the prospect of playing for Green proved to factor in his decision. Wright played in 101 games in nine seasons in the NFL, but never started.

He is the author of I'd Rather be Wright: Memoirs of an Itinerant Tackle (1974, with William Gildea and Kenneth Turan), a fly-on-the wall look at the pro football world of the late 1960s and early 1970s.

In 1969, Wright was the model for the NFL Man of the Year Award (which was changed to honor Walter Payton in 1999), which was sculpted by Daniel Bennett Schwartz; the award still bears Wright's likeness to this day. Wright worked as a salesman for veterinary pharmaceuticals and insurance before retiring, and he now lives in Augusta, Georgia.

References

1942 births
Living people
Players of American football from Louisville, Kentucky
American football offensive tackles
Alabama Crimson Tide football players
Green Bay Packers players
New York Giants players
Washington Redskins players
Chicago Bears players
St. Louis Cardinals (football) players